Mina Caputo (born Keith Caputo; December 4, 1973) is an American singer best known as the lead vocalist and a founding member of New York City alternative metal band Life of Agony. Caputo came out as transgender in 2011 and transitioned to female.

Early life 
Mina Caputo was born on December 4, 1973, in Brooklyn, New York. Both her parents were of Italian-American descent. Both of her parents struggled with heroin addiction, and when she was an infant, her mother died of a heroin overdose and her father (who died in 2002 from similar causes) put Mina under the care of her grandparents, who lived in Mill Basin, New York. Caputo's upbringing was difficult, and her grandfather physically abused her and her grandmother. Despite the physical abuse, Caputo has since forgiven her grandfather; "My grandfather made up for how confused he made me as a kid. He only tried his best and forgiveness is present. I don't blame anyone." Between living with her grandparents, Caputo would also spend time with her cousin, Joseph Zampella (aka Joey Z.), who lived next door, where they would hang out together. Mina also took an interest in playing and studying classical piano.

From a young age, Caputo suffered from gender dysphoria but had to keep quiet about it. "My grandmother used to dress me to go to school, and I asked her, 'Why can't you dress me in girls' clothes?' She says, 'You're not a girl. Don't tell Grandpa you want to dress up as a girl and go to school. He'll fucking kill you. He'll kill me.'"

Career

Life of Agony (1989–1997) 
Caputo started Life of Agony in 1989 with guitarist Joey Z. and bassist Alan Robert. Drummer Sal Abruscato was recruited soon afterwards. After signing with Roadrunner Records, they debuted with the 1993 album, River Runs Red. Shortly after the release of a third album Soul Searching Sun, Caputo left the band in September 1997. Caputo was struggling with internalized gender dysphoria and was becoming disillusioned with the masculine image of herself she was faking at the time. "What good is my success if I can't even enjoy my fucking soul and my body?' I wanted to come out then, but failed miserably and didn't have the courage or the knowhow. I didn't know what to do." Caputo decided to distance herself from the band completely; "It took me to quit the band because I wasn't being true to myself. I had to get away from my band, the label, everyone I worked with."

Solo career, Died Laughing and other activity (1997–2003) 
Following her departure from Life of Agony, Caputo formed a short-lived band called Absolute Bloom, which broke up in July 1998. Caputo also guested on the track "Free Speech (Will Cost You)", which appears on the album Memory Rendered Visible by the band Both Worlds (featuring ex-Cro-Mags vocalist John Joseph), released on Roadrunner Records in April 1998.

Soon after these events, Caputo started work on a solo album, called Died Laughing. The album was released by Roadrunner Records on October 21, 1999, with an acoustic version of the album, Died Laughing Pure, being released on January 9, 2001. Despite receiving generally positive reviews, the album was not a success. Caputo has been heavily critical of Roadrunner's promotion of Died Laughing, and in a 2005 interview to Blistering.com said that Roadrunner "destroyed" her album's success. Despite her criticism of the label, she later returned to contribute vocals for "Tired n' Lonely" on Roadrunner United: The All Star Sessions in celebration of the label's 25th anniversary.

After leaving Roadrunner, Caputo was recruited as the vocalist of the Brazilian industrial metal band Freax, which had reformed after being broken up for over ten years. They released a self-titled album in 2003.

Return to Life of Agony and other solo material (2003–2011) 

The original lineup of Life of Agony reunited for two sold-out shows at New York's Irving Plaza on January 3 and 4, 2003. The reunion resulted in several more shows and appearances on European festivals, as well as the recording of Broken Valley (2005),

In 2003, Caputo formed a group consisting of New York musicians Mike Shaw (bass) and Dan Platt (guitars), along with Dutch musicians Jochem Van Rooijen (drums) and Jack Pisters (lead guitars) that toured and recorded what became the album Live Monsters (2004). On May 1, 2006, Caputo released her third solo album Hearts Blood on Your Dawn which was only sold at her live shows, via mail order through her website, and in the iTunes Store.

In 2007, Caputo recorded her fourth solo album, A Fondness for Hometown Scars, which includes a guest appearance by Flea (of the Red Hot Chili Peppers) on trumpet, amongst others.  Caputo participated as a guest singer on Dutch symphonic metal band Within Temptation's track "What Have You Done", the first single (and second track) from their 2007 album The Heart of Everything.

In 2008, she toured in support of this release, with a band composed of Dutch musicians Ryan Oldcastle (guitars), Axel van Oort (bass), and Jochem van Rooijen (drums). The album was produced by Martyn LeNoble and was released in Europe in April 2008 by Dutch label, Suburban Records.

Recent activity (2011–present) 
In 2011, Caputo formed a side project with Ryan Oldcastle and Michael Shaw called The Neptune Darlings, and released an album on September 15, 2011, called Chestnuts & Fireflies. The style of this CD has been called "geek rock" by The Advocate magazine.

In 2014, Life of Agony re-formed with Caputo singing, releasing the album A Place Where There's No More Pain in 2017, and The Sound of Scars in 2019 with Veronica Bellino replacing longtime drummer Sal Abruscato.

Personal life

In July 2011, Caputo came out as transgender. For a while, her legal name was Keith Mina Caputo. "When I was Keith, I certainly wouldn't allow myself to be as flowery or as vulnerable as I do now," said Caputo in a 2016 interview that appeared on the music website No Echo. "I'm a fucking sissy, get over it [laughs]! I no longer have this masculinity or this manhood to protect. This is a transformation I've been dreaming of my entire life."

Discography

With Life of Agony

Albums
 River Runs Red (1993)
 Ugly (1995)
 Soul Searching Sun (1997)
 1989-1999 (1999)
 Unplugged at the Lowlands Festival '97 (2000)
 The Best of Life of Agony (2003)
 River Runs Again: Live (CD/DVD) (2003) (Live)
 Broken Valley (2005)
 A Place Where There's No More Pain (2017)
 The Sound of Scars (2019)

With Absolute Bloom
 Demo (1998)

As a solo artist

Albums
 Died Laughing (1999)
 Died Laughing Pure (2000) (acoustic versions)
 Perfect Little Monsters (2003)
 Live Monsters (2004) (Live performances)
 Heart's Blood on Your Dawn (2006)
 A Fondness for Hometown Scars (2008)
 Dass-Berdache / Essential Rarities and Demo Cuts (2008)
 Cheat (EP) (2009)
 As Much Truth as One Can Bear (2013)
 Love Hard (2016)
 The Mones (2020)

Singles
 "Selfish" (1999)
 "New York City" (2000)
 "Why" (2001)

With Freax
 Freax (2002)

With The Neptune Darlings
 Chestnuts & Fireflies (2011)

Guest appearances
 "Free Speech (Will Cost You)" (with Both Worlds) (1998)
 "Red Ball in Blue Sky" (with Edenbridge) (2003)
 "Tired 'n Lonely" (with Roadrunner United) (vocals and piano) (2005)
 "What Have You Done" and "Blue Eyes" (with Within Temptation) (2007)
 Additional vocals on A Pale Horse Named Death's debut album And Hell Will Follow Me, a project by fellow LoA-member Sal Abruscato
 "IDA" (with Gator Bait Ten) (vocals) (2014), a project by Science Slam Sonic Explorers

References

External links

 
 

1973 births
21st-century American keyboardists
21st-century American singers
American heavy metal keyboardists
American heavy metal singers
American rock songwriters
American singer-songwriters
American LGBT singers
American LGBT songwriters
Living people
Transgender singers
Transgender songwriters
Transgender women musicians
American women heavy metal singers
American transgender writers